The Swan 43 Holland is the second Swan 43 model this time designed by Ron Holland and built by Nautor's Swan and first launched in 1985 to 1990 with 28 built. They were numbered from 101 to distinguish them from the earlier S&S 43.

External links
 Nautor Swan
 Designers Official Website

References

Sailing yachts
Keelboats
1980s sailboat type designs
Sailboat types built by Nautor Swan
Sailboat type designs by Ron Holland